The male prostitute or hustler is a frequent stereotype in literature and movies in the West from the 1960s on, and especially in movies and books with a gay perspective in which he may be considered a stock character. He also appears occasionally in popular music, some contemporary fashion advertising, and the visual arts.

Stereotypes
 
The most common stereotype of the hustler is as a sexy but tragic figure. This stereotype reveals both a fascination with the hustler as a sexual object and sadness or disdain with his situation and life-style. This stereotyped male hustler is often an underaged or teenage "street kid" or "runaway" forced to leave home because of his sexual orientation or because of sexual abuse. He is often portrayed as a drug addict or thief. 

The plotline frequently focuses on the crisis of leaving the trade or the street ("one last trick"), or on making enough money for an important use (a medical treatment, a gift). The climax often has one of two possible outcomes: the hustler either abandons the trade and re-integrates into society, or he meets a tragic end. This tragic image of the hustler can be contrasted with the stereotype of the female hooker with a heart of gold: instead of being portrayed as someone in control and contented, the hustler is lost, homeless, broke or exploited.

In movies and books that take the point of view of the client or of a boy/girlfriend who loves the hustler, the hustler is often depicted as an impossible love object who will only bring hurt or frustration. The lover may grow jealous of and disturbed by the hustler's work; occasionally the loving boy/girlfriend will be drawn into the lifestyle of their hustler boyfriend. Older clients who fall in love with hustlers are frequently prey to emotional (and sometimes physical) pain; this is especially true in the case of "rough trade" (where the hustler identifies as straight), and this depiction has been reinforced by several famous incidents of violence against clients (such as the deaths of Pier Paolo Pasolini and Rudolph Moshammer).

In contrast to the previous depictions, the male prostitute has also sometimes been portrayed as an idealized rebel living outside the law and free of bourgeois conventions. This almost Nietzschean image of the hustler as moral and sexual outlaw owes much to the writings of Jean Genet, William S. Burroughs and John Rechy (among others).

While less frequent in cinema and novels, the male prostitute with exclusively female clients (the "gigolo" or "escort") is generally depicted in a less tragic manner than the gay hustler (the gigolo is portrayed as older, athletic, well-dressed, etc.), and films like American Gigolo have done much to paint the character as a sophisticated seducer. This portrayal has also led to cinematic satire (the Deuce Bigalow films).

The portrayal of the client or "john" of male prostitution in popular culture is far less codified than that of the hustler and runs the gamut from the lonely married man, the self-hating in-the-closet guy, the exploitative or endearing businessman, and even the serial killer.

The diversity of these stereotypes reveals much about each author's or director's personal view of love, sexuality, power and morality.

These stereotypes may have a basis in fact, but they should not be taken as true in all cases.

The same issues that surround male prostitution (including the financial security and social status of the young "kept" lover, the older lover's obsessions and insecurities with regards to his or her youthful love-object, the sexual freedom or moral indifference of the hustler, etc.) often appear in movies and literature that portray amorous or sexual relationships—without prostitution—between an older man or woman and a younger male lover; for example, in Pasolini's novel and movie Theorem, Harold Prince's film Something For Everyone (1970) and Bill Condon's film Gods and Monsters (1998).

In literature
The following novels, memoirs, and plays feature male hustlers as major characters.

In theater

In cinema

Films with a hustler as a main character

{| class="wikitable"
! Year !! Title !! Country !! Director !! Character !! Actor !! width="500" | Notes
|-
| 1961 || The Roman Spring of Mrs. Stone || United Kingdom || José Quintero || Paolo di Leo || Warren Beatty ||Karen Stone is introduced to a young Italian man, Paolo (Warren Beatty), who is actually a highly paid professional gigolo. Karen and Paolo begin an affair, but it soon becomes obvious that Paolo is in it only for personal gain.
|-
| 1961 || Breakfast at Tiffany's || United States || Blake Edwards ||Paul "Fred" Varjak  || George Peppard ||Varjak is maintained by a rich woman, Mrs. Failenson, who leaves him $300 after every sexual encounter. After falling in love with Holly Golightly (Audrey Hepburn), Varjak cuts off the relationship. Failenson offers $1000 for a "paid vacation with your girl" and cynically suggests that a union (of gigolos) could "get all the fringe benefits" – but Varjak persists in giving up this way of life.
|-
| 1965 || My Hustler || United States || Andy Warhol  Chuck Wein || Paul || Paul America || IMDb
|-
| 1968 || Flesh || United States || Paul Morrissey || Joe ||  Joe Dallesandro || Dallesandro hustles to buy drugs for himself and his wife.
|-
| 1969 || Entertaining Mr Sloane || UK || Douglas Hickox || Mr Sloane || Peter McEnery || Adapted from the play by Joe Orton.
|-
| 1969 || Midnight Cowboy || United States || John Schlesinger || Joe Buck || Jon Voight || Hustler Buck forms an unlikely friendship with junky Rico "Ratso" Rizzo. Academy Award winner for Best Picture.
|-
| 1970 || The Boys in the Band || United States || William Friedkin || "Cowboy" || Robert La Tourneaux || Featured in rejected ads for the film under the tagline: "Today is Harold's birthday. This is his present."
|-
| 1978 || Schöner Gigolo, armer Gigolo (Just a Gigolo)  || West Germany  || David Hemmings ||  Paul Ambrosius von Przygodski || David Bowie ||  An aristocratic Prussian officer returns from World War I to find the world he once knew gone. To make ends meet, he becomes a gigolo. The film was panned by critics and viewers alike. IMDb
|-
| 1978 || El Lugar Sin Limites || Mexico || Arturo Ripstein ||Manuela ||Roberto Cobo|| IMDb
|-
| 1978 || El Diputado  (The Deputy) || Spain || Eloy de la Iglesia || || || Teenage hustler used by the secret police for blackmail falls for the victim. IMDb
|-
| 1980 || American Gigolo || United States || Paul Schrader || Julian Kaye || Richard Gere || High-class gigolo is framed for murder.
|-
| 1982 || Forty Deuce || United States || Paul Morrissey || || Kevin Bacon || Conniving hustler Bacon (who won an Obie for the original 1981 off-off Broadway production) tries to cover-up the overdose death of another kid. IMDb
|-
| 1983 || L'homme blessé  (The Wounded Man) || France || Patrice Chéreau || Henri || Jean-Hugues Anglade || Winner of a César Award for Best Direction. IMDb
|-
| 1983 || Un ragazzo come tanti  (A boy like many others) || Italy || Gianni Minello || || || IMDb
|-
| 1987 || Revolutions Happen Like Refrains in a Song || Philippines || Nick Deocampo || || || IMDb
|-
| 1987 || Less than Zero || United States || || Julian || Robert Downey, Jr. || A young man resorts to performing sexual favors for affluent gay men in order to fund his heroin addiction.  
|-
| 1988 || The Everlasting Secret Family || Australia || Michael Thornhill || || Mark Lee || Homosexuality and prostitution amidst a secret brotherhood. IMDb
|-
| 1988 || Macho Dancer || Philippines || Lino Brocka || Pol  Noel || || Macho dancers in Manila.
|-
| 1988 || Cop || United States || James B. Harris || || || Based on the novel by James Ellroy. IMDb
|-
| 1989 || Loverboy || United States || Joan Micklin Silver || Randy Bodek || Patrick Dempsey || Pizza boy becomes an escort. IMDb
|-
| 1990 || Via Appia || Germany || Jochen Hick || || || IMDb
|-
| 1991 || My Own Private Idaho || United States || Gus Van Sant || Mike WatersScott Favor || River Phoenix  Keanu Reeves ||
|-
| 1991 || J'embrasse pas  (I don't kiss) || France || André Téchiné || || Manuel Blanc || A boy from the provinces ends up as a hustler in Paris.
|-
| 1991 || Where the Day Takes You || United States || Marc Rocco || || Balthazar Getty || A young man living on the streets finds temporary refuge with a client.
|-
| 1992 || Film (Fill 'em) || Canada || Sky Gilbert ||  ||  || Story of a male hustler and his roommate. IMDb
|-
| 1992 || Street Kid (Gossenkind) || Germany || Peter Kern || Axel Glitter || Max Kellermann || A young hustler in Düsseldorf. IMDb
|-
| 1992 || Being at Home with Claude || Canada || Jean Beaudin || Him (Yves)||Roy Dupuis || IMDb
|-
| 1992 || The Living End || United States || Gregg Araki || Luke || Mike Dytri || HIV+ street hustler.
|-
| 1992 || Die Blaue Stunde  (The Blue Hour) || Germany  Switzerland || Marcel Gisler || Theo || Andreas Herder || IMDb
|-
| 1993 || Smukke dreng  (Pretty Boy) || Denmark || Carsten Sønder || || || IMDb
|-
| 1993 || Hatachi no binetsu  (Slight Fever of a 20-Year-Old) || Japan || Ryosuke Hasiguchi || || || One teenage hustler in love with another.
|-
| 1994 || Post Cards from America || UK || Steve McLean || || || Three chapters in David Wojnarowicz's life. IMDb
|-
| 1994 || Super 8½ || Canada || Bruce LaBruce || || || Semi-autobiographical.
|-
| 1994 || Sibak (Midnight Dancers) || Philippines || Mel Chionglo || || || Three brothers in Manila, working as "Macho Dancers" in a gay bar. IMDb
|-
| 1995 || The Basketball Diaries || United States || Scott Kalvert || || Leonardo DiCaprio  Mark Wahlberg || Based on the book by Jim Carroll.
|-
| 1995 || Dupe Od Mramora (Marble Ass) || Serbia || Zelimir Zilnik || || || Transvestite prostitutes in Serbia. IMDb
|-
| 1995 || Tattoo Boy || United States || || ArizonaSam || Amanda TireyC.J. Barkus || IMDb
|-
| 1996 || The Toilers and the Wayfarers || United States || Keith Froelich|| || Matt Klemp  Andrew Woodhouse|| Runaway hustlers in Minneapolis. IMDb
|-
| 1996 || Hustler White || United States || Rick Castro  Bruce LaBruce || Monti || Tony Ward ||
|-
| 1996 || The Unveiling || United States || Rodney Evans || || || IMDb
|-
| 1996 || "Tapin du soir", included in L'Amour est à réinventer || France || Anne Fontaine || || || One of ten collected short films about life in France in the time of AIDS.
|-
| 1996 || Skin & Bone || United States || Everett Lewis || Harry  Billy  Dean || B. Wyatt  Garret Scullin  Alan Boyce || Three Los Angeles hustlers in different stages of their careers.
|-
| 1996 || johns || United States || Scott Silvers || Donner  John || Lukas Haas  David Arquette ||
|-
| 1997 || Private Shows || United States || Blaine Hopkins  Stephen Winter || || || IMDb
|-
| 1997 || Mandragora || Czechoslovakia || Wiktor Grodecki || Marek || Miroslav Caslavka|| IMDb
|-
| 1997 || A River Made to Drown In || United States || James Meredino || || Michael Imperioli  James Duval ||
|-
| 1997 || Star Maps || United States || Miguel Arteta || Carlos Amado || Douglas Spain || IMDb
|-
| 1998 || From the Edge of the City  (Apo tin akri tis polis) || Greece || Constantine Giannaris || || || IMDb
|-
| 1998 || Hard || United States || John Huckert || || || IMDb
|-
| 1998 || In the Flesh || US || Ben Taylor || Oliver Beck || Dane Ritter ||
|-
| 1998 || L'École de la Chair || France || Benoît Jacquot ||Quentin || Vincent Martinez || IMDb
|-
| 1999 || Speedway Junky || United States || Nickolas Perry || Johnny || Jesse Bradford || A young man with dreams of becoming a stock car racer drifts into the world of prostitution in Las Vegas.
|-
| 1999 || Mauvaise passe || France || Michel Blanc || Pierre || Daniel Auteuil || Pierre (Daniel Auteuil) leaves his family and flees to London to work on a novel. There he meets Tom (Stuart Townsend), a male escort, who leads Pierre into his underground world of sex and money.
|-
| 2000 || Km. 0 || Spain || || Miguel || Jesús Cabrero || A gigolo who services female clients.
|-
| 2000 || Nincsen nekem vágyam semmi(This I Wish and Nothing More) || Hungary || Kornél Mundruczó || BrúnóRingó || Ervin NagyRoland Rába || Closted bisexual Brúnó unknown by his girlfriend works as a male prostitute for male clients with her homosexual brother, Ringó.
|-
| 2000 || L.I.E. ||US || Michael Cuesta || Gary || Paul Dano  Billy Kay || A Long Island teenager discovers his best friend (Kay) is a hustler.
|-
| 2001 || Circuit || United States || Dirk Shafer || Hector || Andre Khabbazi || A hustler who's terrified of growing old.
|-
| 2001 || Jet Boy || Canada || Dave Schultz|| || Branden Nadon || A teenage hustler finds a father figure who does not want to exploit him.
|-
| 2001 || Vagón fumador (Smokers Only) || Argentina || Verónica Chen || Leonardo Brzezicki|| Andrés || A suicidal woman and a male prostitute fall in love. IMDb
|-
| 2002 || AKA || UK || Duncan Roy || Benjamin || Peter Youngblood Hills ||
|-
| 2002 || Sonny || United States || Nicolas Cage || Sonny || James Franco || Raised by his mother to be a gigolo. IMDb
|-
| 2003 || Mr. Smith Gets a Hustler || United States || Ian McCrudden || || || IMDb
|-
| 2003 || The Roman Spring of Mrs. Stone || United States, Ireland || Robert Allan Ackerman || Paolo di Leo || Olivier Martinez ||It was a TV film and remake of the 1961 film of the same name.
|-
| 2003 || 200 American || United States || Richard LeMay || || || New York businessman falls for Australian hustler. IMDb
|-
| 2003 || Un fils (A son) || France || Amal Bedjaoui || || || North-African hustler in France. IMDb
|-
| 2003 || Gan (Garden) || Israel || Ruthie Shatz  Adi Barash || || || Two young gay prostitutes in Tel Aviv. IMDb
|-
| 2003 || Twist || || || Dodge || Nick Stahl || Gay-themed re-telling of Dickens' Oliver Twist.
|-
| 2003 || Bulgarian Lovers (Los Novios búlgaros) || Spain || Eloy de la Iglesia || Kyril || Dritan Biba || IMDb
|-
| 2004 || Yeladim Tovim (Good Boy) || Israel || Yair Hochner || MenniTal || Daniel Efrat	Yuval Raz || Two Tel Aviv rent boys. IMDb
|-
| 2004 || Eighteen || Canada || Richard Bell || || || IMDb
|-
| 2004 || Trois 3: The Escort || United States || Sylvain White || Trenton "Trent" Meyer || Brian White || Hip-hop promoter becomes an escort after getting into debt with a gangster.
|-
| 2004 || Ethan Mao || Hong Kong || Quentin Lee || Ethan Mao, Remigio || Jun Hee Lee, Jerry Hernandez ||  An Asian gay teen is kicked out of his house and forced to become a hustler for money. Soon, he meets Remigio, a teen hustler and drug dealer, and the two become friends.
|-
| 2004 || Sugar || Canada || John Palmer || Butch || Brendan Fehr || Coming of age story.
|-
| 2004 || Mysterious Skin || United States || Gregg Araki || Neil McCormick || Joseph Gordon-Levitt || Based on Scott Heim's book.
|-
| 2004 || My Hustler Boyfriend || || Peter Pizzi || || || Short included in video program at Newfest 2005. IMDb
|-
| 2005 || Dirty Little Sins || United States || || || ||
|-
| 2005 || Boy Wonder || United States || Kery Isabel Ramierez || Luis || || Color video short (12 min) about a man living a double life as "straight male" provider and transvestite prostitute. Included in MIX NYC November 2006.
|-
| 2005 || The Wedding Date || United States || Claire Kilner || Nick Mercer || Dermot Mulroney || Woman hires male escort to pose as her boyfriend.
|-
| 2005 || Transamerica || United States || Duncan Tucker || Toby Wilkins || Kevin Zegers || Pre-operative M2F transsexual discovers she has a son (Zegers) who is hustling in New York.
|-
| 2005 || Breakfast on Pluto || UK || Neil Jordan || || Cillian Murphy || Based on the novel by Patrick McCabe. Transvestite flees Ireland for London during the 1970s and becomes a prostitute.
|-
| 2006 || Boy Culture || United States || Q. Allan Brocka || || || Based on the novel.
|-
| 2006 || Can't Buy Me Love || United States || Todd Wilson || || || Short film from Newfest 2006. IMDb
|-
| 2006 || In The Blood || United States || Lou Peterson || || || Gay supernatural thriller featuring a young man dating a Latino hustler. IMDb
|-
| 2006 || Boys Briefs 4 || United States || || || || Six short films about guys who hustle: Boy (Welby Ings); Gigolo (Bastian Schweitzer); Build (Greg Atkins); Into the Night (Tony Krawitz); Gold (Armen Kazazian); Rock Bottom (Mary Feuer). review
|-
| 2006 || Happy Hookers || India || Ashish Sawhny || || || The lives of three male sex workers in India. Short film from Newfest 2007.
|-
| 2006 || Into It || United States || Jeff Maccubbin || || || Two hustlers dealing with drugs and relationships. Film from Newfest 2007.
|-
| 2007 || Before I Forget || France || Jacques Nolot || || || An aging hustler reflects on his life. IMDb
|-
| 2008 || Strictly Sexual || United States || Joel Viertel || || || Two women hire two unemployed construction workers as sex slaves. 
|-
| 2008 || Cliente (A French Gigolo; The Client) || France || Josiane Balasko || Patrick/Marco || Eric Caravaca || A female television anchor falls in love with an internet escort. IMDb
|-
| 2009 || Lucky Bastard || United States || Everett Lewis || Denny || Dale Dymkoski|| Denny is a hustler and meth addict who exploits a man who's fallen in love with him. Lucky Bastard was an Official Selection at Outfest 2009.
|-
| 2009 || Complices (Accomplices) || France || Frédéric Mermoud|| Vincent Bouvier || Cyril Descours || Two detectives try to solve Victor's murder. Victor appears only in flashbacks.
|-
| 2010 || Strapped || United States || Joseph Graham (director)|| Hustler || Ben Bonenfant|| A nameless hustler encounters a series of gay men as he searches for the exit to a client's apartment building. 
|-
| 2013 || Aleksandr's Price || United States || Pau Masó || Aleksandr Ivanov || Pau Masó || A boy named Aleksandr becomes a prostitute in NY, after the death of his mother. IMDb
|-
| 2016 || Romantic Noy (Not Romantic) || West Bengal, India || Rajib Chowdhury || Shekhar || Shaheb Bhattacharya || A boy named Shekhar becomes a prostitute in Kolkata and he entertains women with his body. At a stage he becomes addicted in drugs.
|-
|2022
|Good Luck to You, Leo Grande|United States
|Sophie Hyde
|Leo Grande
|Daryl McCormack
|Retired widow Nancy Stokes (Emma Thompson) hires a good-looking young sex worker called Leo Grande, in the hope of enjoying a night of pleasure and self-discovery after an unfulfilling married life.
|}

Other films that include hustlers
 Advise & Consent (United States: 1962, by Otto Preminger) – Ray Shaff, a former associate of Senator Brigham Anderson, now supports himself as a hustler in New York City.
 The Cheat (la Triche) (France: 1984, by Yannick Bellon with Victor Lanoux and Xavier Deluc)
 JFK (United States: 1991, by Oliver Stone) – Kevin Bacon plays a gay hustler associated with Oswald
 By The Dawn's Early Light (Denmark: 1993, by Knud Vesterskov, narrated by David Wojnarowicz)
 L.A. Confidential (United States: 1997, by Curtis Hanson) – includes a subplot with a young would-be actor, played by Simon Baker, who agrees to sleep with the D.A. for cash, but ends up with his throat cut
 Boogie Nights (United States: 1997, by Paul Thomas Anderson, with Mark Wahlberg and Burt Reynolds)
 Midnight in the Garden of Good and Evil (United States: 1997, by Clint Eastwood, with Kevin Spacey; Jude Law and John Cusack) – based on John Berendt's best-selling book, a prominent Savannah citizen (Spacey) shoots to death his lover
 Happy Together (Hong Kong: 1997, by Wong Kar-wai, with Leslie Cheung and Tony Leung Chiu-Wai; in Mardarin, Cantonese and Spanish) – the brash and irresponsible Ho Po-Wing (Chang) makes his money from the street
 Artificial Intelligence: A.I. (United States: 2001, by Steven Spielberg, with Haley Joel Osment and Jude Law)
 Vers le sud (Heading South) (France: 2005, by Laurent Cantet)
 A Single Man (US: 2010, Tom Ford)

Documentary films

On television
The following television programs feature a hustler as a main character:

In photography
The following photographers, in their work, frequently use the image of the male prostitute:

 Larry Clark
 Terry Richardson
 Nan Goldin
 Wolfgang Tillmans
 Jack Pierson
 Wilhelm von Gloeden
 Philip-Lorca diCorcia

See also
 Male prostitution
 Gigolo
 Pederasty
 Sex tourism
 Female sex tourism

Notes

References
 Katz, Jonathan Ned (1976). Gay American History: Lesbians and Gay Men in the U.S.A.''. New York, Harper Colophon Books.  (1985 edition).

 
LGBT portrayals in mass media